Great Walstead School is a private day school for girls and boys between the ages of 2½ and 13 years with a Christian ethos. It has some 400 children in the school's Nursery, Pre-Prep and Main School departments. The school is a member of the Independent Association of Preparatory Schools.

History 
The school was founded in 1925 by Robert James Mowll (1895–1963), the last Baron Mowll of the Cinque Ports.  It was originally situated at Enfield, north London and known as Kilvinton Hall school.  The school was moved to its current location in 1927 and was renamed Great Walstead school.  Headmasters since Mr Mowll have been Gordon Parke (1960), Nick Bawtree (1986), Hugh Lowries (1991), the Reverend Jeremy Sykes (2006), Colin Baty (2010) and Chris Calvey (2017)

Sports 
The sports that take place are

Houses 
Each pupil belongs to one of the four houses for whom they compete in various sporting activities and academically. Pupils have a house assembly once a week.

Controversy
In 2003, a staff member was detained under Operation Ore.

Notable alumni
Christopher Pole-Carew, in 1979 High Sheriff of Nottinghamshire, and newspaper executive

References

External links
 Website

Preparatory schools in West Sussex
Haywards Heath